Exuperantius is the name of:

Exuperantius of Cingoli, a Catholic saint
Exuperantius of Poitiers, the father of Palladius
the servant of saints Felix and Regula
 Julius Exsuperantius, Roman historian